Neopamera bilobata is a species of dirt-colored seed bug in the family Rhyparochromidae. It is found in the Caribbean Sea, Central America, North America, and South America.

Subspecies
These two subspecies belong to the species Neopamera bilobata:
 Neopamera bilobata bilobata (Say, 1831)
 Neopamera bilobata lineata (Dallas, 1852)

References

External links

 

Rhyparochromidae
Articles created by Qbugbot
Insects described in 1832